Hatchie River Ferry, also known as Miller's Ferry and as Statler's Ferry, on the Hatchie River near Bolivar, Tennessee, was listed on the National Register of Historic Places in 2005.

The ferry crossing was used by a party of Cherokee Nation persons emigrating to Oklahoma, led by John Adair Bell, who was one of the signers of the Treaty of New Echota.  The group crossed the Hatchie River here on November 16–17, 1838.

In 1923 a map shows that there was a sawmill and Statler's Bridge at the crossing.

It includes  of the original roadbed of the historic Savannah-Bolivar Road approaching the Hatchie River on the east side, plus ferry landing area on both east and west banks of the road, and concrete bridge abutments in the river which date from the early 1900s.

The site is deemed significant for its association with the Trail of Tears.

References

National Register of Historic Places in Tennessee
Buildings and structures completed in 1938
Hardeman County, Tennessee
Ferries